Little Cop is a 1989 Hong Kong comedy film directed by Eric Tsang, starring Tsang and Natalis Chan. The film also features cameo appearances from many Hong Kong celebrities such as Andy Lau, Max Mok, Alan Tam, Anthony Chan, Cheung Kwok-keung, Jacky Cheung and Maggie Cheung.

Plot
Ever since he was a child, Lee Chi-kin (Eric Tsang) has been determined to become a police officer, despite the fact that he comes from a family of criminals. As an adult, he joins the police force, where he is first placed with the Narcotics Bureau. During a drug raid operation, he catches a drug dealer.

He is later transferred, first to the Anti-Porno Bureau where he falls in love with a call girl, then to the Regional Crime Unit where he works under Inspector Chu (Natalis Chan). During a drug raid operation, Lee kills drug lord Ng Cheung. Ng's father hires a killer, Thousand Faces Man (Michael Miu), to take revenge on Lee. After several confrontations, Lee finally brings Thousand Faces Man to justice.

The corrupt director of a mental hospital places Lee in the mental hospital for a year, during which time he develops mental disorders. After being discharged from the hospital, he becomes a restaurant waiter.

Cast
Eric Tsang as Lee Chi-kin
Natalis Chan as Inspector Chu
Andy Lau as Traffic cop
Max Mok as Mei Yan-xin
Jacky Cheung as restaurant customer
Maggie Cheung as restaurant customer
John Shum as drug dealer
Stanley Fung as Vice Squad Commander
Sandra Ng as Inspector Ng
Billy Lau as Vice Squad Inspector
Tien Niu as Tin Nau
Chor Yuen as Mei Qing-yi
Michael Miu as Thousand Faces Man
Alan Tam as Head of mental hospital
Anthony Chan as mental hospital doctor
Wu Ma as restaurant waiter
Shing Fui-On as restaurant waiter
Lo Fan as Ugly prostitute
Sze Mei-yee as restaurant patron slapped by waiter
Manfred Wong as restaurant patron punched by waiter
Sze Kai-keung as restaurant patron that exploded
Blackie Ko as Yi's henchmen
Fung Hak-on as Yi's henchmen
Kent Cheng as Yi's butler
Richard Ng as Station Inspector
Cheung Kwok-keung as man who reported himself lost to Station Inspector
Loletta Lee as air stewardess
Alfred Cheung as airplane passenger
Hau Woon-ling as guest at funeral
Maria Cordero as singer at funeral
Charlie Cho as Police Commissioner
Tommy Wong as Jian's robber dad
Elsie Chan as Jian's primary teacher
Derek Yee as Narcotic cop
Yiu Yau-hung as Narcotic cop
Ng Kwok-kin as cop in station
Bill Tung as 7-Eleven clerk
Philip Chan as Rigidity Condom's representative
Sharla Cheung as Dark Skin
Liu Wai-hung as Informer at amusement park
Ram Cheung as singing cop at funeral
Lawrence Cheng as Representative of Cruelty Against Animal
Yip Hon-leung as Representative of gangsters in HK
Lawrence Lau as TV interviewer
Calvin Choi as singer at funeral
Edmond So as singer at funeral
Remus Choi as singer at funeral
Lo Kin as torturer
Jane Ha as Lee's mother
Clarence Fok as Lee's relative
Yau Yuen-hon
Norman Chu
Cho King-man
Wilson Yip
So Ching-man
Peter Ngor
Andrew Lau
Kwong Tin-wo
Wu Shi
Wong Chi-ming
Fei Pak
Dick Cho
Jaime Chik
Kwan Ming-yuk

Box office
The film grossed HK $5,710,742 at the Hong Kong box office during its theatrical run from 21 September to 9 October 1989 in Hong Kong.

See also
Andy Lau filmography
Jacky Cheung filmography

References

External links

Little Cop at Hong Kong Cinemagic

1989 films
Hong Kong slapstick comedy films
1980s crime comedy films
Police detective films
1980s Cantonese-language films
Films directed by Eric Tsang
Films set in Hong Kong
Films shot in Hong Kong
1989 comedy films
1980s Hong Kong films